Oksana Yeremeyeva (nee Ryabinicheva) is a Russian football defender, playing for various clubs in the Russian Championship including Energiya Voronezh. She was a member of the Russian national team.

She is a spouse of Russian footballer Vladimir Yeremeyev.

References

1990 births
Living people
Russian women's footballers
FC Energy Voronezh players
Women's association football defenders
21st-century Russian women